"Walkin' a Broken Heart" is a song written by Dennis Linde and Alan Rush, and recorded by American country music artist Don Williams.  It was released in January 1985 as the third single from the album Cafe Carolina.  The song reached number 2 on the Billboard Hot Country Singles & Tracks chart.

Chart performance

References

1985 singles
Don Williams songs
Songs written by Dennis Linde
Song recordings produced by Garth Fundis
MCA Records singles
1984 songs